The R36 was a New York City Subway car model built by the St. Louis Car Company from 1963 to 1964. The cars are a "follow-up" or supplemental stock to the A Division's R33s, which some of the cars closely resemble. A total of 424 cars were built, arranged in pairs. The order includes World's Fair cars comprising 390 cars, and Main Line cars comprising 34 cars.

The R36s entered service on October 24, 1963, and were overhauled in the mid-1980s. They were retired by 2003 with the delivery of the R142 and R142A cars. While most cars were reefed, some have been preserved, and others have been retained for other purposes.

Description
The R36s were numbered 9346–9769. They were the last entirely LAHT bodied (non-stainless steel) cars built for the New York City Subway.

Cars 9346–9523 and 9558–9769 were specifically purchased for service on the IRT Flushing Line ( and  trains), which was the closest line to the 1964 New York World's Fair. The cars were also referred to as "World's Fair" cars, or R36WFs (R36 World's Fair), and featured three-piece curved "picture" windows, unlike other IRT cars at the time.

Cars 9524–9557 were purchased for service on all other IRT routes. The cars were also referred to as "Main Line" cars, or R36MLs (R36 Main Line) to distinguish them from the "World's Fair" cars. They were built from unfinished car body shells of the R33 order, and therefore featured sported drop-sash side windows.

Although the R36s were later referred to as Redbirds, the cars were originally painted in different schemes when they were delivered. The "World's Fair" cars were painted in a light blue turquoise "Bluebird" scheme, while the "Main Line" cars were painted bright red like the R33s. These color schemes were used until 1977, when the cars were painted in the silver/blue MTA livery. Then, they were painted in a full white (roof, bonnets, sides were all painted white) "anti-graffiti" scheme from 1981 to 1982 to combat graffiti; since the white paint was a Teflon-based paint, the graffiti did not stick to it very well. The look was abandoned for the famous "Redbird" style, which was applied onto the cars when they were rebuilt.

History

Early history
In 1962, the New York City Transit Authority (NYCTA) ordered 430 cars for the  train. This route would run to the World's Fair grounds in Flushing Meadows in Queens. The first 40 cars were singles (R33S), with the rest being R36 cars; single cars were needed since the  service runs 11-car trains, and R36 cars were built only in pairs. 

The first R36 cars ("World's Fair" cars 9558–9561) arrived in fall 1963, shortly after the R33S cars began arriving in September that year. The first train of R33S and "World's Fair" R36 cars was placed in service on the  route on October 24, 1963. With the fair opening approaching on April 12, 1964, "World's Fair" R36 cars were built and delivered in larger quantities that fall. More "World's Fair" cars arrived throughout 1964, enough to displace the R12s, R14s, and R15s from the  train by the close of 1964.

The "Main Line" R36s entered service on the  almost a year later, on July 24, 1964.

Late 1960s–Mid 1980s

From June 2, 1978, to May 1979, Westinghouse "World's Fair" R36s 9494–9503 were assigned to the  train.

The cars returned to their home lines on August 17, 1981.

Rebuilding
Though all cars were originally delivered without air conditioning, all cars in this series gradually received air conditioning as part of a retrofitting program to replace the cars' original Axiflow ceiling fans. The program started in 1976, and by 1982, all cars had received air conditioning as part of the  program.

The "World's Fair" R36s were the first cars to be rebuilt in the NYCTA's General Overhaul Program (GOH) in the 1980s. This program improved car life by rebuilding older cars and keeping other cars in a state of good repair. A trial rebuild program was done on selected Westinghouse R36 cars in 1981–83; the selected cars were rebuilt by Morrison–Knudsen in Hornell, New York. Beginning in late 1984, the other R36 cars were rebuilt at a rate of 200 cars per year, with the majority of them done in-house at the Coney Island Shop. Others were rebuilt by General Electric in Buffalo, New York, and by Amtrak at its Beech Grove, Indiana, and Wilmington, Delaware shops. The last remaining cars were sent out for rebuild in late 1985, and by 1986, all cars were back in service.

After rebuilding, the R36 cars were repainted in a scheme involving a deep maroon red body, black front bonnets and anti-climbers, and a silver roof prior to returning to service. At first, the scheme was known as "Silver Fox", "Broad Street Red",  or "Gunn Red" (after NYCT chief David L. Gunn) and was a graffiti-resistant red. By 1989, the Gunn Red would evolve into the "Redbirds" scheme best known to many New Yorkers, with beige interiors, red exterior paint and interior doors and black, and silver exterior trim along with the car windows, roof, and undersides. In 1999, the R36 cars were the most reliable in the NYCT fleet, with a Mean Distance Between Failure (MDBF) rate of 194,150 miles, despite being 35 years old at the time. While in decent shape mechanically, rust holes and car body corrosion were beginning to form in the sides of most of the cars.

From December 1987 until July 2001 "World's Fair" cars 9478–9523 usually ran on the  train based at Westchester Yard in the Bronx.

Retirement
In 1996, the New York City Transit Authority announced their plans to phase out the Redbirds with the R142 and R142A fleets.

While the Redbirds on the IRT Main Line were retired starting in early 2001, the  service was still provided by R33S cars and R36s. In January 2002, a set of R62As arrived from the IRT mainline.

Most of the Redbirds (1,294) were stripped and then submerged off the coast of Delaware, New Jersey, South Carolina, Georgia, and Virginia as an artificial barrier and diving reefs, by Weeks Marine.

Several R36 cars were saved for various purposes throughout the New York City Subway system. The full list includes:
 "Main Line" pair 9542–9543 – preserved by the New York Transit Museum in Brooklyn since 2004. This pair is currently stored at the 207th Street Yard, awaiting restoration.
 "World's Fair" pair 9586–9587 – also preserved by the New York Transit Museum in Brooklyn. These cars were stored for many years until being moved to the Concourse Yard in summer 2013. In September 2013, the pair was moved to 207th Street Yard and restored to operating status. The cars were initially displayed at the transit museum and finally participated on their first fan trip on June 8, 2014, on the  route, as part of the Train of Many Colors.

"World's Fair" pairs 9582–9583 and 9584–9585 also remain on MTA property. They were transferred to the Unionport Yard along with pair 9586–9587. Pair 9582–9583 was found to have structural issues and was sidelined, while pair 9584–9585 was used on the rail adhesion train until 2019. Plans are unknown for these cars.

In addition to these cars, other cars were also stored around the system. "World's Fair" pair 9400–9401 was stored at the Corona Yard for preservation; however, the cars were never used and were scrapped on October 7, 2013. "World's Fair" pair 9564–9565 was set aside and transferred to Coney Island Yard in December 2004; car 9564 was planned to be repurposed into a visitor center at Queens Borough Hall in Kew Gardens, Queens, and the car 9565 was planned to be preserved in a museum in West Babylon, New York. However, R33 9075 was used at Queens Borough Hall instead of 9564, and 9565 never made it to the proposed museum; the cars were subsequently reefed in 2008. "World's Fair" pair 9588–9589 was stored at the Concourse Yard until 2008, when the pair was reefed.

In culture 
Eight WH-powered "World's Fair" cars (9356–57, 9360–61, 9394–95, 9412–13) and two GE-powered cars (9712–13), in addition to one R33S (9327), were wrapped and painted in New York Mets colors on October 24, 2000, prior to Game 3 of the 2000 World Series between the Yankees and Mets.

In addition, the "World's Fair" cars have made cameo roles in various TV shows and movies. Nicolas Cage rides a  train of "World's Fair" R36s in It Could Happen to You (1994). In the 1988 movie Cocktail, Tom Cruise gets off car 9700 at Vernon Boulevard–Jackson Avenue station.

Notes and references

Notes

References

External links

R36 photos

Train-related introductions in 1964
St. Louis multiple units
New York City Subway rolling stock